The age of criminal responsibility in Australia is the age below which a child is deemed incapable of having committed a criminal offence. In legal terms, it is referred to as a defence of infancy. All states and self-governing territories of Australia have adopted 10 years of age as a uniform age of criminal responsibility. , some jurisdictions have made moves towards raising the age to 12 or 14.

Concerns have been raised about the effects of criminalisation of such young children, and in particular the effects on Aboriginal Australians and Torres Strait Islander people, who are disproportionately represented in the statistics, often reflecting as well as increasing a cycle of disadvantage. In 2019, the Council of Attorneys-General Age of Criminal Responsibility Working Group was tasked with considering submissions from a range of organisations and experts of various backgrounds regarding raising the age to 14. In mid 2020, they indicated that more work was needed to be done on alternative forms of punishment before they could make their recommendations, and in late 2021, the Council of Attorneys-General failed to reach a national consensus.

Background

Doli incapax refers to a presumption that a child is "incapable of crime" under legislation or common law, or rather, the presumption that a child cannot form mens rea as they do not yet have a sufficient understanding of the difference between "right" and "wrong". In the context of Australian law, doli incapax acts as a rebuttable presumption for children aged at least 10 but less than 14.

To rebut this presumption, the prosecution must prove beyond reasonable doubt that the child knew that the act was seriously wrong (not by standards of law, but morally or according to the ordinary principles of reasonable persons) as distinct from an act of "mere naughtiness or childish mischief".

Statistics

According to a 2018 SBS article, around 600 children under 14 are locked up in Australian prisons each year.

On an average night in June 2019, there were 949 young people imprisoned in Australia. Of these:
 90% were male;
 83% were aged 10–17 (the remainder 18–20);
 63% were unsentenced;
 53% were Aboriginal and/or Torres Strait Islander youth.

In the year ending 30 June 2020, there were almost 600 children aged 10 to 13 in detention in Australia.

From June 2015 to 2019, the Northern Territory had the highest rate of young people in detention on an average night.

Calls to raise minimum age
In 2018, legal and medical experts called for the age to be raised to 14. In response, the state and commonwealth Attorneys General decided to investigate the matter, and the Council of Attorneys-General Age of Criminal Responsibility Working Group was established to do this.

According to Australian Medical Association President Dr Tony Bartone, raising the minimum age of criminal responsibility will prevent the unnecessary criminalisation of vulnerable children. In an Australian Medical Association media release, Dr Bartone said:

In November 2019, then Attorney-General of Australia, Christian Porter, was of the opinion that the current system was working well.

In the year ending on 30 June 2020, there were almost 600 children aged 10 to 13 in detention in Australia. Criminologist Chris Cuneen cites a number of well-founded reasons for increasing the minimum age of criminal responsibility in Australia to 14, echoing Dr Bartone's list above. Doctors, lawyers, and a range of experts have called for the minimum age to be raised to 14.

The Australian Human Rights Commission submitted its report, Review of the age of criminal responsibility, to the Working Group on 26 February 2020. The Law Council of Australia submitted its report on 2 March 2020. However in July 2020 the Working Group said that more work needed to be done to determine alternative ways to deal with young offenders, and that the age would remain as it is for at least another year. Both the Attorney General of New South Wales, Mark Speakman, and the Attorney General of South Australia, Vickie Chapman, expressed would not consider passing state laws until the Working Group had finished its review.

By late 2021, the Council of Attorneys-General had failed to reach a national consensus on the issue.

, the debate continues. Criminologist Terry Goldsworthy points out that the sentencing issue is separate from the age of criminal responsibility, and that the number of children held in custody is "exceedingly small", with custodial sentences having declined significantly since 2010. He also argues that the victims of crime (citing the James Bulger case in the UK) need to be taken into consideration. Those concerned with the health and welfare of the children concerned say that incarcerating them can cause "irreparable harm", especially "those with complex neurodevelopmental and mental health needs, trauma, substance misuse, and social disadvantage, [who] are overly represented in the youth justice system.

Effects on Indigenous children

There has been much commentary on the effect that incarceration of children has on Aboriginal and Torres Strait Islander people's lives, with Indigenous children disproportionately represented in the figures (more than 60% of 10–13-year-olds). The Law Council, the Royal Australasian College of Physicians and others have said that there needs to be more emphasis on "support services, treatment, early intervention, prevention, justice reinvestment initiatives, and community-led diversion programs", built on Indigenous authority and culture. The matter of incarceration of Indigenous adults and children, and a recognition of its relationship to disadvantage, has been recognised and reflected in the 2020 targets of the federal government's Closing the Gap strategy.

A documentary film by Maya Newell called In My Blood It Runs follows a ten-year-old Arrernte/Garrwa boy who got into trouble and was almost imprisoned. As a twelve-year-old, the boy was the youngest person ever to make a speech to the UN Human Rights Council about youth incarceration.

Changes
In August 2020, the Legislative Assembly of the ACT voted to increase the age of criminal responsibility to 14 in line with UN standards, a move welcomed by Indigenous advocates. The support was in principle only.

In October 2021, the Labor Party of Western Australia passed a motion at their state party conference to raise the age to 14.

In March 2022, the Queensland Government rejected a bill to raise the age to 14, with a parliamentary committee recommending a continued national approach to increasing the age to 12.

In June 2022, the Tasmanian Government announced that it would raise the minimum age of detention to 14, but with no change to the age of criminal responsibility.

In July 2022, Greens MLC Robert Simms raised a bill in the South Australian Government to raise the age to 14, with Attorney-General and Aboriginal Affairs Minister Kyam Maher taking much interest in the issue.

On 13 October 2022, legislation was introduced to the Northern Territory Government to raise the age of criminal responsibility to 12 years of age. Instead of children of 10 and 11 entering the criminal justice system, they and their families would be referred to "intensive parenting programs", and the government would be expanding various schemes and family support services. The bill, introduced by Attorney-General Chansey Paech, was expected to pass, making NT the first Australian jurisdiction to raise the age above 10, although the commencement date was expected to be delayed until 2023.

By jurisdiction

See also
 Indigenous Australians and crime#Children in detention
Juvenile detention in the Northern Territory
 Punishment in Australia

Footnotes

References

Further reading
 (One of a series)
  
 

Australian criminal law
Age of criminal responsibility
Juvenile justice system